Akhsarbek Kazbekovic Gulaev (born 23 August 1997) is a Russian-born Slovak freestyle wrestler of Ossetian heritage who competes at 79 kilograms. Representing Slovakia since 2017, Gulajev is the reigning European Continental champion and was a silver medalist at the 2017 U23 World Championships and the U23 European Continental Championships in 2018 and 2019. He competed in the 79kg event at the 2022 World Wrestling Championships held in Belgrade, Serbia.

Major results

References

External links
 

1997 births
Living people
Russian male sport wrestlers
Slovak male sport wrestlers
Ossetian people
People from Vladikavkaz
Wrestlers at the 2019 European Games
European Wrestling Championships medalists
European Wrestling Champions
European Games competitors for Slovakia